The 1983 NCAA Division I Men's Ice Hockey Tournament was the culmination of the 1982–83 NCAA Division I men's ice hockey season, the 36th such tournament in NCAA history. It was held between March 18 and 26, 1983, and concluded with Wisconsin defeating Harvard 6-2. All Quarterfinals matchups were held at home team venues while all succeeding games were played at the Winter Sports Center in Grand Forks, North Dakota.

The Badgers' goal differential (+16) is a record for an NCAA tournament, equaling the record set by Colorado College in 1950 and matched by Michigan in 1953.

Qualifying teams
The NCAA permitted 8 teams to qualify for the tournament and divided its qualifiers into two regions (East and West). Each of the tournament champions from the three Division I conferences (CCHA, ECAC and WCHA) received automatic invitations into the tournament with At-large bids making up the remaining 5 teams, an additional 2 western and 3 eastern schools.

Format
The tournament featured three rounds of play. The two odd-number ranked teams from one region were placed into a bracket with the two even-number ranked teams of the other region. The teams were then seeded according to their ranking. In the Quarterfinals the first and fourth seeds and the second and third seeds played two-game aggregate series to determine which school advanced to the Semifinals. Beginning with the Semifinals all games were played at the Winter Sports Center and all series became Single-game eliminations. The winning teams in the semifinals advanced to the National Championship Game with the losers playing in a Third Place game.

Tournament bracket

Note: * denotes overtime period(s)

Quarterfinals

(E1) Harvard vs. (W4) Michigan State

(E2) Providence vs. (W3) Minnesota–Duluth

(W1) Wisconsin vs. (E4) St. Lawrence

(W2) Minnesota vs. (E3) New Hampshire

Semifinal

(W1) Wisconsin vs. (E2) Providence

(E1) Harvard vs. (W2) Minnesota

Third-place game

(E2) Providence vs. (W2) Minnesota

National Championship

(E1) Harvard vs. (W1) Wisconsin

All-Tournament team
G: Marc Behrend* (Wisconsin)
D: Chris Chelios (Wisconsin)
D: Mark Fusco (Harvard)
F: Patrick Flatley (Wisconsin)
F: Scott Fusco (Harvard)
F: Paul Houck (Wisconsin)
* Most Outstanding Player(s)

References

Tournament
NCAA Division I men's ice hockey tournament
March 1983 sports events in the United States
NCAA Division I Men's Ice Hockey Tournament
NCAA Division I Men's Ice Hockey Tournament
NCAA Division I Men's Ice Hockey Tournament
NCAA Division I Men's Ice Hockey Tournament
NCAA Division I Men's Ice Hockey Tournament
NCAA Division I Men's Ice Hockey Tournament
History of Madison, Wisconsin
1980s in Minneapolis
Ice hockey competitions in Boston
Ice hockey competitions in Minneapolis
Ice hockey competitions in North Dakota
Ice hockey competitions in Providence, Rhode Island
Ice hockey competitions in Wisconsin
Sports in Grand Forks, North Dakota
Sports in Madison, Wisconsin